A transversely isotropic material is one with physical properties that are symmetric about an axis that is normal to a plane of isotropy. This transverse plane has infinite planes of symmetry and thus, within this plane, the material properties are the same in all directions. Hence, such materials are also known as "polar anisotropic" materials. In geophysics, vertically transverse isotropy (VTI) is also known as radial anisotropy.

This type of material exhibits hexagonal symmetry (though technically this ceases to be true for tensors of rank 6 and higher), so the number of independent constants in the (fourth-rank) elasticity tensor are reduced to 5 (from a total of 21 independent constants in the case of a fully anisotropic solid). The (second-rank) tensors of electrical resistivity, permeability, etc. have two independent constants.

Example of transversely isotropic materials

An example of a transversely isotropic material is the so-called on-axis unidirectional fiber composite lamina where the fibers are circular in cross section. In a unidirectional composite, the plane normal to the fiber direction can be considered as the isotropic plane, at long wavelengths (low frequencies) of excitation. In the figure to the right, the fibers would be aligned with the  axis, which is normal to the plane of isotropy.

In terms of effective properties, geological layers of rocks are often interpreted as being transversely isotropic. Calculating the effective elastic properties of such layers in petrology has been coined Backus upscaling, which is described below.

Material symmetry matrix 
The material matrix  has a symmetry with respect to a given orthogonal transformation if it does not change when subjected to that transformation.  
For invariance of the material properties under such a transformation we require

Hence the condition for material symmetry is (using the definition of an orthogonal transformation)

Orthogonal transformations can be represented in Cartesian coordinates by a  matrix  given by

Therefore, the symmetry condition can be written in matrix form as

For a transversely isotropic material, the matrix  has the form

where the -axis is the axis of symmetry.  The material matrix remains invariant under rotation by any angle  about the -axis.

In physics 
Linear material constitutive relations in physics can be expressed in the form

In matrix form,

Examples of physical problems that fit the above template are listed in the table below.

Using  in the  matrix implies that . Energy restrictions usually require  and hence we must have . Therefore, the material properties of a transversely isotropic material are described by the matrix

In linear elasticity

Condition for material symmetry 
In linear elasticity, the stress and strain are related by Hooke's law, i.e., 

or, using Voigt notation,

The condition for material symmetry in linear elastic materials is.

where

Elasticity tensor

The elasticity stiffness matrix  has 5 independent constants, which are related to well known engineering elastic moduli in the following way. These engineering moduli are experimentally determined.

The compliance matrix (inverse of the elastic stiffness matrix) is

where .  In engineering notation, 

Comparing these two forms of the compliance matrix shows us that the longitudinal Young's modulus is given by

Similarly, the transverse Young's modulus is 

The inplane shear modulus is

and the Poisson's ratio for loading along the polar axis is
.

Here, L represents the longitudinal (polar) direction and T represents the transverse direction.

In geophysics 
In geophysics, a common assumption is that the rock formations of the crust are locally polar anisotropic (transversely isotropic); this is the simplest case of geophysical interest.  Backus upscaling is often used to determine the effective transversely isotropic elastic constants of layered media for long wavelength seismic waves.

Assumptions that are made in the Backus approximation are:
 All materials are linearly elastic
 No sources of intrinsic energy dissipation (e.g. friction)
 Valid in the infinite wavelength limit, hence good results only if layer thickness is much smaller than wavelength
 The statistics of distribution of layer elastic properties are stationary, i.e., there is no correlated trend in these properties.

For shorter wavelengths, the behavior of seismic waves is described using the superposition of plane waves.  Transversely isotropic media support three types of elastic plane waves:
 a quasi-P wave (polarization direction almost equal to propagation direction)
 a quasi-S wave
 a S-wave (polarized orthogonal to the quasi-S wave, to the symmetry axis, and to the direction of propagation).
Solutions to wave propagation problems in such media may be constructed from these plane waves, using Fourier synthesis.

Backus upscaling (long wavelength approximation) 
A layered model of homogeneous and isotropic material, can be up-scaled to a transverse isotropic medium, proposed by Backus.

Backus presented an equivalent medium theory, a heterogeneous medium can be replaced by a homogeneous one that predicts wave propagation in the actual medium. Backus showed that layering on a scale much finer than the wavelength has an impact and that a number of isotropic layers can be replaced by a homogeneous transversely isotropic medium that behaves exactly in the same manner as the actual medium under static load in the infinite wavelength limit.

If each layer   is described by 5 transversely isotropic parameters , specifying the matrix

The elastic moduli for the effective medium will be

where 

 denotes the volume weighted average over all layers.

Short and medium wavelength approximation 
Solutions to wave propagation problems in linear elastic transversely isotropic media can be constructed by superposing solutions for the quasi-P wave, the quasi S-wave, and a S-wave polarized orthogonal to the quasi S-wave.
However, the equations for the angular variation of velocity are algebraically complex and the plane-wave velocities are functions of the propagation angle  are.  The direction dependent wave speeds for elastic waves through the material can be found by using the Christoffel equation and are given by

The Thomsen parameters are used to simplify these expressions and make them easier to understand.

Thomsen parameters 
Thomsen parameters are dimensionless combinations of elastic moduli that characterize transversely isotropic materials, which are encountered, for example, in geophysics.  In terms of the components of the elastic stiffness matrix, these parameters are defined as:

where index 3 indicates the axis of symmetry .  These parameters, in conjunction with the associated P wave and S wave velocities, can be used to characterize wave propagation through weakly anisotropic, layered media. Empirically, the Thomsen parameters for most layered rock formations are much lower than 1.

The name refers to Leon Thomsen, professor of geophysics at the University of Houston, who proposed these parameters in his 1986 paper "Weak Elastic Anisotropy".

Simplified expressions for wave velocities 
In geophysics the anisotropy in elastic properties is usually weak, in which case .  When the exact expressions for the wave velocities above are linearized in these small quantities, they simplify to

where 

are the P and S wave velocities in the direction of the axis of symmetry (in geophysics, this is usually, but not always, the vertical direction).  Note that  may be further linearized, but this does not lead to further simplification.

The approximate expressions for the wave velocities are simple enough to be physically interpreted, and sufficiently accurate for most geophysical applications.  These expressions are also useful in some contexts where the anisotropy is not weak.

See also 
 Hooke's law
 Linear elasticity
 Orthotropic material

References

Crystallography
Orientation (geometry)
Elasticity (physics)